

Events
Joan Esteve wrote , a planh for Guilhem de Lodeva, the French admiral

Births
 Jacopo Alighieri (died 1348), Italian poet, the son of Dante Alighieri

Deaths
 Fakhruddin Iraqi (born 1213), Persian Sufi writer

13th-century poetry
Poetry